Madonna dei Tramonti is a fresco by the Italian artist Pietro Lorenzetti. It was in the Basilica of San Francesco d'Assisi, in Assisi, Italy, although now it is under private ownership.

The fresco is accompanied by a frescoed niche containing the liturgical implements.

References

1330s paintings
Paintings by Pietro Lorenzetti
Paintings of the Madonna and Child
Paintings in Umbria
Assisi